The Diocese of Härnösand is a division in the Church of Sweden in Västernorrland County. The Cathedral is located at Trädgårdsgatan in Härnösand.

History
The diocese was established in 1647. In 1904, the diocese of Luleå was formed, breaking away from the diocese of Härnösand.

Between 1994-2004, several churches of the diocese experienced a series of thefts.

Parishes
The diocese is divided into 10 deaneries with 113 parishes, these among others:
Anundsjö
Åre
Härnösand
Offerdal
Örnsköldsvik
Östersund
Sidensjö
Sollefteå
Tännäs
Torsåker
Ytterlännäs

Bishops
Petri Erici Steuchius (1647-1683)
Mathias Steuchius (1683-1694)
Julius Micrander (1695-1702)
Georgius Nicolai Wallin (1703–1723)
Petrus Jonæ Asp (1723–1726)
Nicolaus Sternell (1728–1744)
Olof Kiörning (1746–1778)
Eric Hesselgren (1779–1803)
Carl Gustaf Nordin (1805–1812)
Erik Abraham Almquist (1814–1830)
Frans Michael Franzén (1832–1847)
Israel Bergman (1848–1864)
Anders Fredrik Beckman (1865–1875)
Lars Landgren (1876–1888)
Martin Johansson (1888–1908)
Ernst Frithiof Lönegren (1910–1934)
Torsten Bohlin (1935–1950)
Gunnar Hultgren (1951–1958)
Ruben Josefson (1958–1967)
Arne Palmqvist (1967–1975)
Bertil Werkström (1975–1983)
Bengt G. Hallgren (1983–1991)
Karl-Johan Tyrberg (1991–2001)
Tony Guldbrandzén (2001–2009)
Tuulikki Koivunen Bylund (2009–2014)
Eva Nordung Byström (2014–present)

References

External links
 

 
Västernorrland County
1647 establishments in Sweden
Religious organizations established in 1647